Pan-Illyrian theories were proposed in the first half the twentieth century by philologists who thought that traces of Illyrian languages could be found in several parts of Europe, outside the Balkan area.

First attempt
Pan-Illyrism had both archaeological and linguistic components. Archaeologists were looking for an ethnicity for the Lusatian culture and the linguists for the Old European water names. First, the French pressed for the Ligurs and Celts but then the German prehistorians and linguists, beginning with Gustaf Kossinna, and following Julius Pokorny, and Hans Krahe, linked the Illyrians with the Lusatian culture and Old European hydronyms. Kossinna divided the primitive Indo-Europeans into two groups, North and South Indo-Europeans; he conjectured that the ancestors of Celtic, Illyrian, Greek and Italic people, who belonged to the first group, inhabited north Germany in the Stone Age and Early Bronze Age and were driven out by Germanic people advancing from Schleswig-Holstein and Jutland about 1800–1700 BC "the first Germans in Germany". Kossinna also stated that at the time of Hallstatt culture which succeeded the Bronze Age of Central Europe, the Illyrian civilization of the valley of the middle Danube was superior to that prevailing among the Celts established in the southern portion of the Germany and elements of the Illyrian civilization found their way not only into the Celtic cradle of the south Germany but also to the territory of the east Germany occupied by Germanic tribes. The earliest use of iron in Central Europe was to be attributed to Illyrians and not to the Celts.

Julius Pokorny located the Urheimat between the Weser and the Vistula and east from that region where migration began around 2400 BC. Pokorny suggested that Illyrian elements were to be found in much of the continental Europe and also in the British Isles.

Pokorny's Illyromania derived in part from archaeological Germanomania and was supported by contemporary place-name specialists such as Max Vasmer and Hans Krahe.

Krahe's version
In his 1937 work, Krahe discussed the Venetic language, known from hundreds of inscriptions as an Illyrian language, which forms the separate Illyrian branch of the Indo-European language family with the Messapian of southern Italy and the Illyrian spoken in the Balkans. Krahe thought that only the name of the Illyrian and Adriatic Enetos peoples were the same. Homer mentions a people in Asia Minor, the Paphlagonians, as coming from the Enetai province, and a few hundred years later Herodotus refers to the Enetos people twice, once as Illyrian and again as the occupants of the Adriatic sea. Krahe thought that the name of  the Illyrian and Adriatic Enetos peoples are the same and if Adriatic Enetos were Venets and Venets were the Veneds mentioned in other sources then Illyrian and Veneds were the same people. The basis of this theory is the similarity of the proper nouns and place names, but most of all in the water names of the Baltic and the Adriatic (Odra, Drava, Drama, Drweca, Opawa, Notec, etc.). Having the model of Illyrian in mind, he assumed that together these elements represented the remnant of one archaic language.
 
The problem was that the name of Venets and Veneds is scattered over a huge territory, from British Isles to Baltic Sea and from Northern Italy to the Southern Balkans. Since no trace of Illyrians remains in the Northern zone, the Venets (or Veneds) became the transmitter of the Illyrian place-names and by the end of World War II, the Illyrians had become a vast conspiracy of Indo-European place names, now spreading from Gaul to the Balkan Peninsula.

By 1950, many of the onomastic irregularities once dubbed Illyrian had now become Old European. First, Krahe presented the view that the Veneti language forms a separate branch in itself. He noticed that the Illyrian language was made now of some Messapic Inscriptions and a great number of places and proper nouns. From this small item of linguistic material, he concludes that Illyrian is a Centum language and its relationship with German, Italic and Celtic languages lies in that territory of the Urheimat of this language correlates solely with the Lusatian culture. In Krahe's words: "All of them the Illyrians, the Italic, and the Venet have...clear connections to the Germans, that is they came from the north...and later moved to the south." This meant that the people of the Lusatian culture advanced to the eastern part of the Alps to the historical territory of the Illyrians around 1200 BC.

Following Krahe's work, János Harmatta placed Illyrians in South Germany and the Alpine region. Tribes living there would have spoken Illyrian which deferred from Latin, German and Venetic. Around 1300 BC, the people of the Barrow-mound culture, the Illyrians, moved eastwards and then southwards along the Danube (the first Illyr migration) and in 750 BC the people of the Hallstatt C culture expanded toward western Hungary (the second Illyr migration) which gathered Pannonian tribes to itself. 1000 BC is considered the beginning of the historical peoples we call the Illyrians.

In his later work, Krahe substituted Pokorny theory with that of Old European hydronymy, a network of names of water courses dating back to the Bronze Age and to a time before Indo-European languages had developed in central, northern and western Europe. He examined the layers of European water names and did so using two theses. The first thesis was that the oldest layer will always be the one that can not be explained with the language of the people who currently live on the banks or shores of the given water, and/or consist of a monosyllabic stem carrying a meaning (at times derived or conjugated monosyllabic words). He found that these monosyllabic water names give a system which he called Alteuropäisch (Old European). The network of old European water names comprises waters from Scandinavia to lower Italy, and from the British Isles to the Baltic. It denotes the period of development of the common Indo-European language which was finished by the second millennium BC. Krahe claimed that by that time the Western languages (Germanic, Celtic, Illyrian, the so-called Italic group – the Latin-Faliscus, the Oscan-Umbrian along with Venetic-Baltic and to some extent Slavic though they still constituted a uniform Old European language and further divided later) had already dissociated from the ancient Indo-European language. The similarities in European hydronyms resulted from the radiation of this old European system, and not from the resemblance of the common words in the later separate languages.

Other versions
While many scholars placed Illyrian in North Europe other scholars extended the territory of the Illyrian people in the south too (Giuliano Bonfante, Vladimir I. Georgiev etc.). One of them, Georgiev, claimed that "the Pelasg that is the people before the Hellas Greeks, were Illyrian". Their language would have been Indo-European, more specifically a dialect of the Illyrian-Thracian language, and Etruscan was a later dialect of the latter. The Thracians and Illyrians would have been the link between the central (Italic, Greek, Aryan) and the southern (Pelasg, Luwiy, Hittite) Indo-Germanic groups. Georgiev's theory however, received a lot of criticism and was not widely accepted.

Criticism
The Pan-Illyrian theory received much criticism, and one of the many critiques was that of Antonio Tovar, who demonstrated that the majority of hydronyms in the north of Europe had a non-Indo-European origin – an idea that Krahe dismissed, but was later  reiterated by Theo Vennemann in his Vasconic substratum hypothesis.

The Pan-Illyrian theory began with archaeological findings also its end coincided with it. As Katičić linguistically restricted what is to be considered Illyrian, newer archeological investigations made by Alojz Benac and B. Čović, archaeologists from Sarajevo, demonstrated that there was unbroken continuation of cultural development between Bronze and Iron Age archeological material, therefore ethnical continuation too and this created the autochthonous Illyrian theory, by which Illyrian culture was formed in the same place (Western Balkans) from older Bronze Age cultures.

According to Benac, the Urnfield culture bearers and proto-Illyrians were different people. Moreover, he claimed that the Urnfield culture migration might have caused several other population movements (e.g. Dorian migration). This theory was supported by Albanian archaeologists and Aleksandar Stipčević which says that the most convincing theory for the genesis of the Illyrians was the one given by Benac, but pointing to Liburnians and their pre-Indo-European and Mediterranean phases in development Stipčević claims that there was no equal processing of Illyrian origin in the different areas of the Western Balkans.

See also
Illyrian languages

References

Sources

Paleo-Balkan languages
Indo-European linguistics